Valeriy Fyodorovich Dmitriyev (born 10 October 1984) is a Kazakhstani road bicycle racer, last for  of the UCI ProTour.

Major results

2004
 1st Stage 3 Giro delle Regioni
 3rd  Road race, Asian Road Championship
2005
 1st Overall Tour of Greece
2006
 3rd Overall Tour of Egypt
1st Stage 5
2008
 3rd Overall Vuelta a Navarra

References

External links

Kazakhstani male cyclists
1984 births
Living people
Sportspeople from Almaty
20th-century Kazakhstani people
21st-century Kazakhstani people